Lito: Live at the North Sea Jazz Festival is a live album by saxophonist Carlos Ward, his debut as a leader. It was recorded on July 9, 1988, at the North Sea Jazz Festival in Rotterdam, Netherlands, and was released on LP in 1989 by Leo Records. On the album, Ward is joined by trumpeter Woody Shaw, bassist Walter Schmocker, and drummer Alex Deutsch. The album was reissued in 1992 with an additional track.

Reception

The editors of AllMusic awarded the album 4½ stars, and writer Michael G. Nastos called it "excellent."

The authors of The Penguin Guide to Jazz Recordings described the album as "a valuable documentation both of Ward and of Woody Shaw, who sounds magnificent." They stated: "What is interesting about Lito is how effective a writer the saxophonist is."

Track listing
All compositions by Carlos Ward.

 "Lito (1,2,3)" – 24:28
 "Pettiford Bridge" (Dedicated to Oscar Pettiford) – 7:42 (bonus track on CD reissue)
 "Lee" – 13:05
 "First Love" (Dedicated to T. Monk) – 5:23
 "Sundance" – 7:38

Personnel 
 Carlos Ward – alto saxophone, flute
 Woody Shaw – trumpet
 Walter Schmocker – bass
 Alex Deutsch – drums

References

1989 live albums
1989 debut albums
Live jazz albums
Leo Records live albums